Nathalie Heirani Salmon-Hudry (born 9 August 1983) is a writer from Tahiti, French Polynesia. Her book Je suis née Morte (I was born dead) was awarded the Vi Nimö literary prize in New Caledonia in 2015.

Salmon-Hudry is severely disabled due to a medical error during her birth. She writes using a computer head pointer; her book Je suis née morte is an autobiography which describes her life growing up with a disability in Tahiti.

References

1983 births
Living people
Autobiographers
French Polynesian people with disabilities
French Polynesian writers